The Pleasure Drivers is an 2006 American thriller drama film.  It was directed by Andrzej Sekuła and written by Adam Haynes. It stars Lauren Holly, Angelo Spizzirri, Steffany Huckaby, Meat Loaf, Jill Bennett, Lacey Chabert and Angus Macfadyen.

Premise
The Pleasure Drivers lays out three separate interconnected stories involving a therapist, a  call girl, a lesbian hit woman, a kidnapper, and a brain-damaged ex-cult guru.

Release
The film, produced in 2005, was not subject to a theatrical release, but was instead released Direct-to-DVD.  It was released in Iceland in 2006 and in the United States, the United Kingdom and the Netherlands in 2007.

Cast
 Lauren Holly as Daphne Widesecker 
 Angelo Spizzirri as Tom Ethot 
 Steffany Huckaby as Casey Ethot 
 Meat Loaf as Dale 
 Angus Macfadyen as Bill Plummer 
 Lacey Chabert as Faruza
 Jill Bennett as Marcy  
 Deena Dill as Alexis Plummer 
 Sascha Knopf as Amity 
 Billy Zane as Marvin 
 Frank O'Neill as The Manager of "The Big Cock Inn" 
 Timothy Patrick Cavanaugh as Dick

References

External links
 
 

2006 films
2000s thriller films
American crime thriller films
2000s English-language films
Hyperlink films
Lesbian-related films
LGBT-related thriller films
2000s American films